Sterlingfest Art and Music Fair is a yearly summer festival in the city of Sterling Heights, Michigan. It is held in the first week of August at Dodge Park and usually draws crowds of 120,000-125,000 people over a three-day period.  Sterlingfest mixes the tradition of an arts and crafts fair with a jazz and blues stage, a Suds’n’Sounds stage, Kidzfest children's activities and entertainment stage, a family midway, local restaurateurs and a main headliner stage.

History
The Sterlingfest Art and Music Fair Sterling Heights, Michigan was originally known as Sterling Heights Solid Gold Summerfest and began in 1983, Thursday, July 14 - Saturday, July 16, as a 3-day festival in Dodge Park (Utica Road and Dodge Park Road). The original community event was created by the staff of the City Parks and Recreation Department who included, D. Martin Piepenbrok (event founder), Debra Bozich, Susan Kebbe, Michael Kostrzeba, Terry Carlson, Gordon Lonie, Helen Cerny, Cheryl Cameron, Cindy Guzi, Arlene Washburn, and others, under the leadership of Thomas L. Chappelle, Director of Parks and Recreation.

The festival continued to grow over the years to become one of the most highly anticipated summer festivals in southeast Michigan. From the humble beginnings of evening concerts and dance parties, to kids relay events, to buskers, to classic car shows, to hot-air balloon liftoffs, and day-long Saturday mini-stage shows, the festival became larger and drew greater attendance. An Arts and Crafts Fair was added to Summerfest in 1991 that was coordinated in collaboration with the city's Community Relations Department, Pat Lehman, Director.

The festival was later renamed the Sterlingfest Art and Music Fair and today it offers a wide variety of outstanding activities in a street fair-like setting with multiple performance stages, a Kidzfest activities and entertainment venue, headliner main stage concerts, carnival rides, the juried art show, restaurant row, 5K Run, and much, much more. The venue has expanded beyond Dodge Park and now embraces the Sterling Heights Civic Center including city's historic Upton House, by a water fountain and along the Sterling Heights sculpture walk, featuring the city's public art along with a “SterlingScapes” exhibit of large-scale outdoor sculptures on loan from cutting-edge Michigan artists.

The COVID-19 pandemic in 2020 caused Sterlingfest to go on hiatus until 2021.

Sterlingfest returned in July 2022, July 28–30, celebrating its 38th year.

Awards
Detroit News’ “Michigan’s BEST Summer Festival” title in 2008

WXYZ 7 Action News Viewers rated Sterlingfest metro Detroit's number one summer festival in 2019.

Events
Sterlingfest features a variety of music, including jazz, blues, and top 40 entertainment.  There is  a Suds’n’Sounds stage, Kidzfest children's activities and entertainment stage, a family midway, local restaurateurs and a main headliner stage.

References

Music festivals in Michigan
1983 establishments in Michigan
Tourist attractions in Macomb County, Michigan
Sterling Heights, Michigan